BBC National Short Story Award is a British literary award for short stories. It was founded in 2005 by the NESTA (the National Endowment for Science, Technology and the Arts) with support from BBC Radio 4 and Prospect magazine. The winner receives  for a single short-story. The award was originally known as 'National Short Story Award' and renamed to 'BBC' starting in 2008 to reflect the current sponsor.

Normally the award is open to British authors only, in 2012 the award was opened to a global audience for one year only in honour of the 2012 Summer Olympics which were hosted in London.

Winners
2006 – "An Anxious Man", James Lasdun
2007 – "The Orphan and the Mob", Julian Gough
2008 – "The Numbers", Clare Wigfall
2009 – "The Not-Dead and the Saved", Kate Clanchy
2010 – "Tea at the Midland", David Constantine
2011 – "The Dead Roads", D. W. Wilson
2012 – "East of the West", Miroslav Penkov
2013 – "Mrs Fox'', Sarah Hall
2014 – "Kilifi Creek", Lionel Shriver
2015 – "Briar Road", Jonathan Buckley
2016 – "Disappearances", K. J. Orr
2017 – "The Edge of the Shoal", Cynan Jones
2018 – "The Sweet Sop", Ingrid Persaud
2019 – "The Invisible", Jo Lloyd
2020 – "The Grotesques", Sarah Hall
2021 – "All the People Were Mean and Bad", Lucy Caldwell
2022 – "Blue 4eva", Saba Sams

References

External links
BBC National Short Story Award

British literary awards
Awards established in 2005
Short story awards
BBC awards
2005 establishments in the United Kingdom